Mathieu Lafon (born 1 March 1984) is a French former professional football player.

He played on the professional level in Ligue 1 and Ligue 2 for Montpellier HSC.

References

1984 births
Living people
French footballers
Association football midfielders
Ligue 1 players
Ligue 2 players
Championnat National players
Championnat National 2 players
Montpellier HSC players
Thonon Evian Grand Genève F.C. players
US Créteil-Lusitanos players
Grenoble Foot 38 players